Glasbury-on-Wye railway station was a station in Glasbury, Powys, Wales. The station closed in 1962.

References

Further reading

Disused railway stations in Powys
Railway stations in Great Britain opened in 1864
Railway stations in Great Britain closed in 1962
1962 disestablishments in Wales
Former Midland Railway stations